Édouard Roger-Vasselin and Igor Sijsling were the defending champions, but chose not to participate.
Vasek Pospisil and Jack Sock won the title, defeating Steve Johnson and Sam Querrey in the final, 6–3, 5–7, [10–5].

Seeds

Draw

Draw

References
 Main Draw

BBandT Atlanta Open - Doubles
2014 Doubles